This is a timeline documenting events of Jazz in the year 1968.

Events

June 
 12 – The 2nd Montreux Jazz Festival started in Montreux, Switzerland (June 12 – 18).
 30 – The 15th Newport Jazz Festival started in Newport, Rhode Island (June 30 – July 3).

Unknown date 
 The English avant-rock ensemble Henry Cow was founded at Cambridge University.

Album releases

Peter Brötzmann: Machine Gun
Don Cherry: Eternal Rhythm 
Chick Corea: Now He Sings, Now He Sobs 
Miles Davis: Filles de Kilimanjaro 
Bill Evans:  Bill Evans at the Montreux Jazz Festival
Milt Jackson: "Milt Jackson and the Hip String Quartet"
Roland Kirk: Left & Right
Michael Mantler: The Jazz Composer's Orchestra
Hugh Masekela: The Promise of a Future
Roscoe Mitchell: Congliptious 
Modern Jazz Quartet: Under the Jasmin Tree
Sun Ra: Outer Spaceways Incorporated 
Horace Silver: Serenade to a Soul Sister 
Spontaneous Music Ensemble: Karyobin 
John Surman: John Surman
McCoy Tyner: Tender Moments
Kenny Wheeler: Windmill Tilter 
Gary Bartz: Another Earth 
Pat Martino: Baiyina 
Charles Tolliver: Paper Man
Herbie Hancock: Speak Like a Child
Miles Davis: Miles in the Sky
Hugh Masekela: The Lasting Impression of Hugh Masekela
Hugh Masekela: Africa '68

Deaths

 February
 5 – Luckey Roberts, American composer and stride pianistr (born 1887).
 15 – Little Walter, American singer and harmonica player (born 1930).
 27 – Frankie Lymon, American singer (heroin overdose) (born 1942).

 March
 5 – Monk Hazel, American drummer (born 1903).

 June
 15 – Wes Montgomery, American guitarist (born 1923).
 26 – Ziggy Elman, American trumpeter (born 1914).

 October
 18 – Jack Bland, American banjoist and guitarist (born 1899).

 November
 9 – Jan Johansson, Swedish pianist (born 1931).
 23 – Reinhold Svensson, Swedish pianist, Hammond organist, and composer (born 1919).

 December
 31 – George Lewis, American clarinetist (born 1900).

 Unknown date
 Eyvin Andersen, Danish organist, violinist, and composer (born 1914).
 Jay Wilbur, British bandleader (born 1898).

Births

 January
 19 – Jørn Øien, Norwegian pianist.
 21 – Frank Kvinge, Norwegian guitarist.

 February
 4 – Tim Lefebvre, American bass guitarist.
 18 – Jukka Perko, Finnish saxophonist.
 19 – Stochelo Rosenberg, Dutch guitarist.
 22 – Rodney Whitaker, American upright bassist.

 March
 1 – Per Oddvar Johansen, Norwegian drummer.
 2 – Rune Brøndbo, Norwegian keyboardist and guitarist.
 6 – Jakob Dinesen, Danish saxophonist.
 21 – Vincent Courtois, French cellist.
 22 – Arve Henriksen, Norwegian trumpeter and multiinstrumentalist.
 24 – Sherman Irby, American alto saxophonist.

 April
 30 – Russ Nolan, American saxophonist.

 May
 1 – D'arcy Wretzky American bassist, The Smashing Pumpkins.
 9 – Anthony Wilson, American guitarist.
 19 – Kyle Eastwood, American bassist.

 June
 6 – Alan Licht, American guitarist, composer, and journalist, Run On.
 19 – John Hollenbeck, American drummer and composer, The Claudia Quintet.

 July
 10 – David Gald, Norwegian guitarist.
 16 – Finn Guttormsen, Norwegian bassist.
 17 – Julia Hülsmann, German pianist and composer.

 August
 4 – Eric Alexander, American saxophonist.
 18 – Ernie Hammes, Luxembourgian trumpeter, arranger, composer, and big band director.
 20 – Frode Barth, Norwegian guitarist.
 28 – Larry Goldings, American pianist, organist, and composer.
 30 – Vahagn Hayrapetyan, Armenian pianist, singer, and composer.

 September
 9 – David Sánchez, Puerto Rican tenor saxophonist.
 13 – Bernie Williams, Puerto Rican former professional baseball player and musician. 
 30 – Antonio Hart, American alto saxophonist.

 November
 14 – Ken Ford, American violinist.
 30 – Sylvie Courvoisier, Swiss composer, pianist, and improviser.

 December
 7 – Noël Akchoté, French guitarist.
 16 – Lalah Hathaway, American singer.

 Unknown date
 Jean David Blanc, French film producer, writer, and jazz musician.

See also

 1960s in jazz
 List of years in jazz
 1968 in music

References

External links 
 History Of Jazz Timeline: 1968 at All About Jazz

Jazz
Jazz by year